Iveta Vējone (born 4 July 1966) is a Latvian teacher who served as the First Lady of Latvia from 2015 to 2019. She is the wife of former President of Latvia Raimonds Vējonis.

Honours
 : First Class of the Order of the Cross of Terra Mariana (2 April 2019)
: Grand Cross of the Order of the Crown (11 June 2018)

References

Living people
1966 births
First ladies and gentlemen of Latvia
Latvian educators
Recipients of the Order of the Crown (Netherlands)
Recipients of the Order of the Cross of Terra Mariana, 1st Class